Vijaya, also called Vijaya Dhanusha, is a divine bow in Hindu tradition. The bow was created by Vishvakarma, the architect of the gods, for Indra, the ruler of Svarga.

Legend
The bow was created by Vishvakarma, the architect of the gods, and granted to Indra. After Indra had defeated many asuras with the help of this bow, he granted it to Lord  Parashurama. On 21 different occasions, when the ruling Kshatriyas began oppressing their subjects and committing sin, Parashurama, armed with the Vijaya bow, hunted them to the brink of extinction, nearly ridding the world of the varna. Each time, Parashurama donated the territory won from the Kshatriyas to the Brahmins for the re-establishment of order.

Mahabharata
The Mahabharata discusses how the ownership of the bow passed on to Rukmi:

According to the Mahabharata, Parashurama takes on Karna as his student. Since Karna is a worthy student, Parashurama blesses Karna with the Vijaya, along with other celestial weapons. The Vijaya bow is mentioned by name only once in the text, during the Kurukshetra war, on the 17th day, when Karna fights against Arjuna.

Significance 
The bow Vijaya is described to sound like a thundercloud, and capable of terrifying the entire world. When Druma, the heavenly kinnara, presents the bow to Rukmi, it is stated that the Vijaya is on par with the Gandiva.

In Shaiva tradition, the Vijaya was wielded by Shiva, and presented to his devotee, Parashurama. It is stated that the string of the bow cannot be broken by any astra, and that when mustered, it creates a blinding flash of light that is bright enough to leave one's enemy incapacitated.

See also 

 Gandiva
 Sharanga
 Pinaka

References

Mahabharata
Bows (archery)
Weapons in Hindu mythology